The Borough of Fylde is a local government district with borough status in Lancashire, England.  It covers part of the Fylde plain, after which it is named. The council's headquarters are in St Annes. Some council departments, including Planning and an office of the Registrar, were previously located in Wesham, but in 2007 these offices were transferred to the ownership of the NHS North Lancashire Primary Care Trust and have since been replaced by a new housing development. The population of the non-metropolitan district at the 2011 census was 75,757.

Fylde borough was formed under the Local Government Act 1972, on 1 April 1974 by the merger of the borough of Lytham St Annes, Kirkham Urban District, and Fylde Rural District. It borders the unitary Authority of Blackpool, along with the Preston, South Ribble, West Lancashire and Wyre districts.

The armorial arms of the borough bear the motto of the former Fylde RDC "Gaudeat Ager" from Psalm 96: 'Let the field (Fylde) be joyful' - "Let Fylde Prosper". The armorial bearings comprise a complete Achievement of Arms, that is - shield, crest and helm and mantling, supporters, badge and motto. They reflect the union of the three local authorities in the area: Lytham St Annes Borough Council, Kirkham Urban District Council and Fylde Rural District Council.

The Mayor of Fylde for 2022-2023 is Councillor Ben Aitken .

Fylde Borough Council

In the 2019 Fylde council election, on 2 May 2019, the Conservatives retained control of the council. Composition of the council is now Conservative - 31, Independent (including no party or description stated on the ballot paper) - 17, Lytham St. Anne's Independents - 2, Liberal Democrats - 1 . The turnout was 39 per cent.

Settlements

Civil parishes

Bryning-with-Warton
Elswick
Freckleton
Greenhalgh-with-Thistleton
Kirkham
Little Eccleston-with-Larbreck
Medlar-with-Wesham
Newton-with-Clifton
Ribby-with-Wrea
St Annes-on-the-Sea
Singleton
Staining
Treales, Roseacre and Wharles
Weeton-with-Preese
Westby-with-Plumptons
Lytham is unparished.

References

 
Local government in the Borough of Fylde
Non-metropolitan districts of Lancashire
Boroughs in England